Zenons Popovs (28 June 1906 – 1944) was a Latvian cyclist. He competed in the team pursuit event at the 1928 Summer Olympics.

References

External links
 

1906 births
1944 deaths
Latvian male cyclists
Olympic cyclists of Latvia
Cyclists at the 1928 Summer Olympics
Place of birth missing